Yura-Gora is a rural locality (a village) in Tarasovskoye Rural Settlement of Plesetsky District, Arkhangelsk Oblast, Russia. The population was 13 as of 2010.

Geography 
Yura-Gora is located 100 km east of Plesetsk (the district's administrative centre) by road. Barkhatikha is the nearest rural locality.

References 

Rural localities in Plesetsky District